Auditory meatus can refer to: 
 external auditory meatus
 internal auditory meatus